The 2014 Liga Nusantara North Maluku season is the first edition of Liga Nusantara North Maluku is a qualifying round of the 2014 Liga Nusantara.

The competition scheduled starts in May 2014.

Teams
This season there are 14 North Maluku club participants.

League table
Divided into one group.

Result

References 

North Maluku